Ákos Angyal is a Hungarian sprint canoer who competed in the late 1980s and early 1990s. He won a silver medal in the K-4 10000 m event at the 1989 ICF Canoe Sprint World Championships in Plovdiv and a bronze medal in the K-2 1000 m event at the 1991 ICF Canoe Sprint World Championships in Paris.

References

Hungarian male canoeists
Living people
Year of birth missing (living people)
ICF Canoe Sprint World Championships medalists in kayak
20th-century Hungarian people